The 2017 Vuelta a Burgos was a men's road bicycle race which was held from 1 August to 5 August 2017. It is the 39th edition of the Vuelta a Burgos stage race, which was established in 1946. The race was rated as a 2.HC event and forms part of the 2017 UCI Europe Tour. The race was made up of five stages.

Teams
Eighteen teams entered the race. Each team had a maximum of eight riders:

Route

Stages

Stage 1

Stage 2

Stage 3

Stage 4

Stage 5

Classification leadership

References

External links

2017
2017 UCI Europe Tour
2017 in Spanish road cycling
August 2017 sports events in Europe